Patricia Guerra Cabrera (born 21 July 1965 in Las Palmas de Gran Canaria, Las Palmas) is a Spanish sailor who won gold medal at the 1992 Summer Olympics in Barcelona. She did so in the 470 class alongside Theresa Zabell. She also competed at the 1988 Summer Olympics, finishing in tenth place.

References

External links
 
 
 
 

1965 births
470 class world champions
Living people
Olympic gold medalists for Spain
Olympic medalists in sailing
Olympic sailors of Spain
Real Club Náutico de Gran Canaria sailors
Sailors at the 1988 Summer Olympics – 470
Sailors at the 1992 Summer Olympics – 470
Spanish female sailors (sport)
Medalists at the 1992 Summer Olympics
World champions in sailing for Spain
Mediterranean Games gold medalists for Spain
Competitors at the 1993 Mediterranean Games